Eliot Goldthorp (born 3 November 2001) is an English footballer who plays college soccer for the Hofstra Pride, as a midfielder.

Career
Goldthorp was born in Leeds and played youth football for Manchester United, Leeds United and Bradford City.

Goldthorp made his senior debut for Bradford City on 25 September 2018 in the EFL Trophy in a 1–1 draw against Everton U21s, scoring the winning penalty. On 9 October 2018, manager David Hopkin stated that Goldthorp would make his first senior start, also in the EFL Trophy. He was praised by Hopkin for his performance in the match, which was a 4–1 home defeat.

On 1 October 2019 he moved on loan to Mossley. He scored 3 goals in 5 games before being recalled by Bradford City later that month. His 5 games for Mossley included 3 in the league, 1 in the Manchester Premier Cup, and 1 in the FA Trophy Preliminary Round where he scored a hat-trick.

He moved on loan to Radcliffe in December 2019. On 8 January 2020 the loan deal was ended early. In February 2020 he moved on loan to Matlock Town until the end of the season.

Goldthorp was released by Bradford City at the end of the 2019–20 season.

He signed for Farsley Celtic in October 2020.

In December 2020, Goldthorp and teammate Joe West signed for Northern Premier League side Frickley Athletic on a dual registration deal.

In May 2021, Goldthorp signed to play collegiate soccer in the United States at Old Dominion University. In his freshman season, Goldthrop made 13 appearances, scoring four goals, and providing two assists, leading the team in total points. After his freshman season, he transferred to Hofstra University. During his first year at Hofstra he made 21 appearances, scoring 17 goals. He helped Hosftra qualify for the 2022 NCAA Division I men's soccer tournament. There, he scored twice for the Pride before they were eliminated in the first round.

During the 2022 college offseason, he played for the Des Moines Menace in USL League Two making 12 appearances, scoring nine goals and providing two assists.

Personal life
His sister Francesca plays rugby league for Leeds Rhinos and England.

Career statistics

References

2001 births
Living people
English footballers
Manchester United F.C. players
Leeds United F.C. players
Bradford City A.F.C. players
Mossley A.F.C. players
Radcliffe F.C. players
Matlock Town F.C. players
Association football midfielders
English Football League players
USL League Two players
Des Moines Menace players
Farsley Celtic F.C. players
Frickley Athletic F.C. players
Old Dominion Monarchs men's soccer players
Hofstra Pride men's soccer players
English expatriate footballers
English expatriates in the United States
Expatriate soccer players in the United States